Yours and Owls was a brand and annual music festival that is held in Wollongong, Australia. 
It originally started as a coffee shop, then a gallery and restaurant space, then a music venue, then pop-up gigs, a record label, and now holds an annual music festival. in addition to events throughout the year in local venues.

Awards and nominations

National Live Music Awards
The National Live Music Awards (NLMAs) are a broad recognition of Australia's diverse live industry, celebrating the success of the Australian live scene. The awards commenced in 2016.

|-
| National Live Music Awards of 2018
| Yours and Owls
| Best Live Music Festival or Event
| 
|-
|  National Live Music Awards of 2019
| Yours and Owls
| NSW Live Event of the Year
| 
|-
| National Live Music Awards of 2020
| Yours and Owls
| Best Live Music Festival or Event
| 
|-

Lineups year by year

2014

Bootleg Rascal
Dune Rats
The Griswolds
Hockey Dad
High-tails
Lyall Moloney
The Owls
Owl Trivia DJs
Safia (band)
Step-Panther DJs
Sticky Fingers (band)

2015

The Preatures
Cloud Control
The Delta Riggs
The Rubens
Gang Of Youths
Saskwatch
The Smith Street Band
Ash Grunwald
Bahamas
Salmonella Dub Soundsystem
Shining Bird
The Pinheads

2016

Antwon (USA)
Ball Park Music
Bec Sandridge
The Belligerants
Big Scary
Black Mountain (CAN)
Bleached (USA)
Chastity Belt (USA)
Client Liaison
The Coathangers (USA)
Cog
DMA's
The Hard Aches
Hermitude
Hockey Dad
Horror My Friend
The Jezabels
Kilter
KLP
Ladyhawke (NZ)
Little May
The Living End
Nicole Millar
Pagan
Pinheads
PUP (CAN)
Remi
Sampa the Great
Skeggs
Shining Bird
The Sonics (USA)
Stonefield
TEES
Thelma Plum
Tired Lion
Tkay Maidza
Totally Unicorn
Vera Blue

2017

At The Drive In (US)
The Presets
Illy (rapper)
Dune Rats
Allday
Northlane
Safia (band)
The Preatures
Bad Dreems
A.B. Original
Alex Lahey
Ali Barter
AJJ (band) (US)
City Calm Down
Confidence Man (band)
Cosmo's Midnight
Crooked Colours
Easy Life
Holy Holy (Australian band)
Le Butcherettes (US)
Montaigne
Northeast Party House
Sorority Noise (US)
The Orwells (US)
Trophy Eyes
Bec Sandridge
Cash Savage and the Last Drinks
Donny Benet Showband
Electric Wire Hustle (NZ)
Ghost Wave
Gold Class – CANCELLED
Ivan Ooze (rapper)
Major Leagues – CANCELLED
Moonbase
The Pinheads
Horror My Friend
Ruby Fields
Slum Sociable
TEES
Totally Unicorn
Wavves
Rad Stage
Archy Punker
Body Type
Break A Leg
Good Boy
Hoon
Jacob
Los Pintar
Los Tones
Love Buzz
RAAVE TAPES
Raised as Wolves
S M Jenkins
Sub Tribe
Sun Sap
The Nah
Totty
Tyne-James Organ
White Blanks
BF5: Das Schmeltz Haus Stage
Andy Garvey
Ariane
Elodie
Jamie Blanco
Jon Watts
Jozef Connor & Albert Hunt
Kato
Massive Marbo & The Battered Sav
Pals
Paul Jextra
Ravespewtin
Sam Weston
Simon Caldwell
Somersault
Stamp Daddy & Space Gas

2018

Angus & Julia Stone
Peking Duk
Alison Wonderland
The Jungle Giants
Methyl Ethel
Ocean Alley
Hockey Dad
D.D Dumbo
Middle Kids
Cub Sport
Alex the Astronaut
Alice Ivy
Big White
BOYTOY (USA)
CLEWS (Australian band)
Dear Seattle
Destroyer (CAN)
Didirri
E^ST
Fritz
Hellions
Jack River
Jess Locke
Johnny Hunter
Liars (USA)
Listenr (USA)
Luca Brasi
Maddy Jane
Mallrat
Mere Women
Mezko
Moaning Lisa
Nyxen
Obscura Hail
Pist Idiots
Polaris
Press Club
Psychedelic Porn Crumpets
Rolling Blackouts Coastal Fever
Sarah Blasko
Step-Panther
Stonefield (band)
The Vanns
Tiny Little Houses
Touch Sensitive (producer)
Tropical Fuck Storm
Tumbleweed (band)
Yahtzel (Live)
You Beauty
DAS SCHMELTHAUS STAGE
ADI TOOHEY
AYEBATONYE
CARLA URIATE
CHELSEYDAGGER
DELICIOUS CITRUS & AL GORES RHYTHM
JEALOUSING
LANCELOT
LEX DELUXE
PARKSIDE
ROZA TERENZI
THE DOLLAR BIN DARLINGS
TONI YOTZI
TORNADO WALLACE
UNKNOWN ASSOCIATES
THE LOCAL Stage
ASTROPHYSICAL MASER
BIKE PARK GALLERY
CORTEX JOURNAL
DUZI CUATRO
ENOUGH SAID SLAM POETRY
HIDDEN HARVEST
JACUZZI STU
OVUHM
PRIDE TIDE
QUEER SPACE
SANDWICH PRESS ZINES
STRAWBERRY VISIONS

2019

Amy Shark
Courtney Barnett
Golden Features
Hot Dub Time Machine
Angie McMahon
Love Fame Tragedy (UK)
Meg Mac
Ruel
Skegss
Slumberjack
Sneaky Sound System
Thundamentals
Vera Blue
Bad Dreems
Baker Boy
Bass Drum of Death (USA)
Eves Karydas
Frenzal Rhomb
Fucked Up (CAN)
Kwame (Australian rapper)
No Mono
Odette
Waax (band)
Yumi Zouma (NZ)
The Beths (NZ)
Blank Realm
Ceres (band)
The Delta Riggs
Die! Die! Die! (NZ)
Genesis Owusu
The Gooch Palms
Good Doogs
Hatchie (musician)
Kira Puru
Ocean Grove (Australian band)
The Pinheads
Totally Unicorn
West Thebarton
A.Swazye & The Ghosts
Bugs
Crocodylus
Eliza & The Delusionals
Georgia June
The Lazy Suzans
Low Life
Murmurmur
The Nights
Pacific Avenue
San Mei
Special Local Guests
Burn In Hell
Chuparosa
Dribs
Ducy Muncs
Fait Accompli
Fika
Friday Park
Hopetown
Husband Wants A Wife
Ivori
Legal Aliens
Lemon Row
Rukus
Sam Allen
Tapestry
Tex
The Bungalows
The Fangin’ Felines
The Hints
Tuff Mustard
Underplay
99scapegoast

2020 
Due to COVID-19 restrictions, the 2020 Yours and Owls festival was moved from its usual October date to 2021.

Controversies 
On April 16th 2021, Youtube comedian FriendlyJordies uploaded a video titled "Cancel Culture KILLS Artists (Yours and Owls)" that detailed their negative experience with Yours and Owls through a series of e-mails claiming that FriendlyJordies is racist to Aboriginals due to 'a couple of staff reacting to a tiktok video' of him, despite his views being in-line with the elders of the area in question. In the video, Jordies describes Yours and Owls as a 'hipster mafia' that has 'replicated the function of a tick' who, through majority control of venue management in Wollongong, have a stranglehold on artists and control who is and isn't allowed to operate in Wollongong with financial stability. It currently has over 390,000 views and 26,000 likes.

References

Music festivals in Australia
Annual events in Australia
Events in New South Wales
Companies based in New South Wales